Robin Douglas Lees (born 19 May 1949) is an English former first-class cricketer.

Lees was born at Cranleigh in Surrey and later studied at St Edmund Hall at the University of Oxford. While studying at Oxford, he made three appearances in first-class cricket for Oxford University in 1970, against Surrey, Middlesex and Glamorgan. He scored 29 runs in his three matches, though with his right-arm medium pace bowling, he took just one wicket, that of Surrey's Stewart Storey.

References

External links

1949 births
Living people
People from Cranleigh
Alumni of St Edmund Hall, Oxford
English cricketers
Oxford University cricketers